Zam or ZAM or similar may refer to:

Places 
Zam, Burkina Faso, a town
Zam Department
Zam Rural District of Iran
Zam, Hunedoara, a commune in Romania
Zam (river), Hunedoara County, Romania

People 
ZAM-1, Australian artist and designer
Chef Zam (born 1970), Malaysian chef
Okna Tsahan Zam (born 1958), Kalmyk folk singer
Ruhollah Zam (1978–2020), Iranian activist
Sherab Zam (1983), Bhutanese archer
Zam Fredrick (born 1959), American basketball player
Zam Wesell, a character in the film Star Wars Episode II

Other uses 
Zam, a Zoroastrian concept
Zam (irrigation), a system of irrigation used in Pakistan
ZaM, a Serbian record label
ZAM, the IATA code for the Zamboanga International Airport in the Philippines
ZAM, the International Olympic Committee country code for Zambia
zam, the ISO 639 code for the Miahuatlán Zapotec language of Mexico

See also 
 Zamzam (disambiguation)
 Zamrock, a rock music genre
 Zams
 Zim and Zam
 Zor and Zam